Argiris SER Saraslanidis (born June 22, 1978 in Thessaloniki, Greece) is a Greek street artist and illustrator currently based in Corfu island. He is one of the pioneers in the urban / street art scene of Greece.

Overview 
Drawing inspiration from cartoons, nature, candy and video games, Ser's work (a curiously eclectic blend of graffiti, comic culture and pop surrealism) employs an arsenal of monstrous but somewhat benign characters through glimpses and images of a bizarre parallel universe. Ser's work is all over Greece, in the form of large-scale murals, paintings placed in important collections and commercial work, created in association with major local and international brands.

Early years 
Argiris Ser was born and raised in Thessaloniki, Greece. He studied graphic design and comics. Argiris became involved with street art in 1993, when he started to make graffiti.

Sample of work 

Argiris Ser work can be found all around Greece but also in countries like U.K., France, Italy, Belgium, Netherlands, Germany, Spain, Cyprus and more, as he has been travelling around, participating in various mural projects and exhibitions.

Exhibitions

Selected group exhibitions 
 2006: Horizons, Montana Gallery, Amsterdam.
 2007: Spray 2007, 1st Street Artists Show in Tehran, Mehrin Gallery, Tehran.
 2008: Energy Show, Miami (US).
 2009: 9 directions expo, 2nd International Graffiti & Street Art Exhibition, Cultural Center of the City of Thessaloniki, Greece.
 2011: International Contemporary Art Fair of Athens, Athens, Greece. 
 2011: Symbiosis?, XV Biennale de la Méditerranée, Thessaloniki, Greece.
 2012: Spectrum, artAZ, "Technopolis" City of Athens, Athens, Greece.
 2013: Cultural Bridges: Athens - Quito, artAZ (in collaboration with Home Identity), Quito (Ecuador).
 2013: Moniker Art Fair, artAZ booth, London (UK).
 2014: Like New!, Benaki Museum, Athens, Greece.

See also 
 List of street artists

Bibliography 
Iossifidis K. (1997) Graffiti in Greece. The colour of the city. Athens: Oxy.

Iossifidis K. (2000) Graffiti in Greece. The colour of the city. Vol. 2. Athens: Oxy.

References

External links 
 Argiris Ser Blog
 Argiris Ser on Facebook
 Argiris Ser on Instagram

1978 births
Living people
Artists from Thessaloniki